The Gallery Car is a bilevel rail car, originally created by the Pullman Company as the Pullman Gallery Car. It has had five total different manufacturers since its creation, including Budd, St. Louis Car Company, Amerail,  Nippon Sharyo and  Canadian Vickers. These double-decker passenger car were built by Pullman-Standard during the 1950s to 1970s for various passenger rail operators in the United States.

The car's upper level was accessed by four sets of stairs in the middle vestibule. A narrow walkway with handrail and middle sections open looking below. Passengers disembarked from stairs from the vestibule on both sides. The original bench seating on the lower level was often upgraded to individual seats during rebuilds by operators. The 8700 series cars feature a control cab; this is not found in the 7600 series cars.

Design

Railcar 
The Gallery Car is made of the usual stainless steel and is a bilevel, however there is a drop down in the middle to the first floor. This choice was made in particular to allow conductors to make a single pass through the car to collect passenger fares instead of having to go to each floor.

The car height is near the same as a Superliner (16' 2"), being only approximately four inches shorter, at 15' ~10". The height isn't the same across the brands, such as when comparing a Budd to an Amerail.

Highliner II 
An electric multiple unit (EMU) variant of the railcar has been produced by Nippon Sharyo, of which only Metra and the NICTD South Shore Line own and operate. They operate on overhead wires, and only have cab car variants, with each set containing two.

History 
The Gallery Car was constructed originally by Pullman and Budd in between the 1950s-70's, as 4 different models: The 7006A, 7600, 8700, and the Town Cars. The 8700 Series introduced the cab cars, with CN&W being the first customers for it.

Over time, as Pullman went bankrupt, other companies began to manufacture the railcar, those mainly being Amerail and Nippon Sharyo.

(Nippon Sharyo is the only current manufacturer left as all of its other manufacturers no longer exist).

Models
There were four types:

Operators
 AMT - Canadian Vickers-built gallery cars (all retired)
 Amtrak: Acquired twelve cars from the Chicago and North Western Railway in the 1970s; ten coaches and food-service cars. Amtrak converted four of coaches into control cars in 1981–1982. All twelve were off the roster by 1994.
 Burlington Northern and Santa Fe - acquired the six Transcisco Tours gallery cars and converted them to be used as business cars (BNSF #40–45); two were later converted to track geometry cars.
 Canadian Pacific Railway - Montreal passenger routes and cars transferred to STCUM, and then to AMT (all retired)
 Chicago and North Western - sold cars to Metra and Amtrak
 Foxville and Northern - shortline operator in North Carolina. Owns 7 former VRE cars. Leased to other operations for various events.
 Metra - currently used on the Milwaukee District lines and the Union Pacific routes 
 Music City Star - acquired seven Metra gallery cars.
 Southern Pacific - Peninsula Commute, then Caltrain. Operated 46 gallery cars (SP 3700–3745) until 1985. Sold to Tour Alaska in 1986. Colorado Railcar converted four (SP 3734, 3740, 3744, 3745) into "Ultra Dome" cars at Tillamook, Oregon. Six sold to Transcisco Tours (SP 3700–3703; 3707, 3708), subsequently acquired by BNSF.
 Transcisco Tours - acquired six from SP and converted them for tour use (#800532–800537).
 Utah Transit Authority FrontRunner - for parts
Virginia Railway Express - Operated 50 ex-Metra gallery cars from 2001 until replacement by new Nippon Sharyo gallery cars from 2006 to 2017.  
GO Transit - borrowed both CP Rail and Chicago and North Western cars for trial runs in 1976.

Current owners 

† Eight cars ordered in February 2012 with options for 42 more. As of 2018, 21 further cars had been procured from these options.

EMU current owners

Preserved cars
 Three cars, two coaches and a cab car, are preserved at the Illinois Railway Museum. Others serve on heritage railroads like the North Shore Scenic Railroad, which has 3, 2 of which are in the original C&NW paint scheme. Numerous others survive, but are still in operation on railroads like Metra.
An Ex-Agence metropolitaine de transport gallery coach is on display at the Canadian Railway Museum in Saint-Constant, Quebec.

Future 
Eventually this railcar will be phased out. Two large passenger railroads are getting new equipment to phase out the cars, with Metra and Virginia Railway Express purchasing custom Coradia Bi-Levels from Alstom, and Caltrain getting Stadler KISS EMUs from Stadler Rail, to become fully electrified.

Gallery

See also
 Bombardier Bi-Level Coach
 Hi-Level

References

External links 

 

Railcars of the United States